Minas Department is a  department of Córdoba Province in Argentina.

The provincial subdivision has a population of about 4,881 inhabitants in an area of 3,730 km², and its capital city is San Carlos Minas.

Settlements
 Ciénaga del Coro
 El Chacho
 Estancia de Guadalupe
 Guasapampa
 La Playa
 San Carlos Minas
 Talaini
 Tosno

Departments of Córdoba Province, Argentina